Patrick O'Neal Baldwin Sr. (born August 22, 1972) is an American assistant college basketball coach for the Georgetown Hoyas. He previously served as the head coach of the Milwaukee Panthers basketball team. He played college basketball for the Northwestern Wildcats, and played professionally in Bosnia and Croatia.

Early life
He is a native of Leavenworth, Kansas and attended Leavenworth High School.

Playing career
He was a standout basketball player for Northwestern from 1990 to 1994. He still ranks 1st in school history with 272 career steals, 2nd all-time with 452 assists and 20th with 1,189 points. His 90 steals as a freshman in 1990–91 are the school's single-season record, while his 154 assists as a senior in 1993–94 rank third in school history. In 1990-1991 season and the 1992-1993 season he led the Big Ten in steals. In the 1992-1993 he led the Big Ten in free throw percentage.   Baldwin played professionally in Bosnia and Croatia averaging 18 points, 2 assist, and 3 steals per game.

Coaching career
Baldwin began his coaching career as an assistant at Lincoln (Missouri) during the 2001–02 season. He joined Tod Kowalczyk's staff at Green Bay from 2002 to 2004. Baldwin was an assistant coach at Loyola (Illinois) from 2004 to 2011, followed by a two-year stint as an assistant at Missouri State. Baldwin served as an assistant coach at Northwestern from 2013 to 2017. He was named the head coach of the Milwaukee Panthers on June 20, 2017, signing a five-year deal. Baldwin replaced LaVall Jordan, who accepted the head coaching position at Butler. His son Patrick Baldwin Jr., a five-star recruit, committed to play at Milwaukee under his father in 2021.

Baldwin was dismissed as head coach at Milwaukee on March 2, 2022 at the conclusion of the school's fifth straight losing season. He finished with an overall record of 57–92 and a 34–59 mark in Horizon League competition.

On June 16, 2022, media reporting indicated that Georgetown had hired Baldwin as an assistant coach for the 2022–2023 season.

Head coaching record

Personal life
Baldwin is married to former Northwestern volleyball player Shawn Baldwin (née Karey). They have four children together: Patrick Jr., Tatum, Brooke, and Claire.

References

1972 births
American men's basketball players
Living people
Basketball coaches from Kansas
Basketball players from Kansas
American expatriate basketball people in Bosnia and Herzegovina
American expatriate basketball people in Croatia
College men's basketball head coaches in the United States
Green Bay Phoenix men's basketball coaches
Loyola Ramblers men's basketball coaches
Milwaukee Panthers men's basketball coaches
Missouri State Bears basketball coaches
Northwestern Wildcats men's basketball coaches
Northwestern Wildcats men's basketball players
Sportspeople from Leavenworth, Kansas
Point guards
Place of birth missing (living people)